Summer Cup may refer to:

Summer Cup (ATC), a Group 3 Australian Turf Club thoroughbred horse race
Summer Cup (Scottish football), a defunct Scottish football cup competition held in the 1940s and 1960s
Summer Cup (South Africa), a horse race held at the Turffontein Racecourse in South Africa
Kazan Summer Cup, an annual professional tennis tournament, held in Kazan, Russia
Summer Cup (Uttoxeter), a horse race held at Uttoxeter Racecourse in Britain

See also
Summer Cups, another term for Fruit Cup